Umyot is an urban locality (a work settlement) and the administrative center of Umyotsky District of Tambov Oblast, Russia, located in the upper streams of the Vyazhlya River (Don's basin),  east of Tambov. Population: 

It was first mentioned in 1710. Urban-type settlement status was granted to it in 1968.

References

Urban-type settlements in Tambov Oblast